The CONMEBOL Libertadores, also known as the Copa Libertadores de América, is an annual international club football competition organized by CONMEBOL since 1960. It is the highest level of competition in South American club football. The tournament is named after the Libertadores (Spanish and Portuguese for liberators), the leaders of the Latin American wars of independence, so a literal translation of its former name into English is "America's Liberators Cup".

The competition has had several formats over its lifetime. Initially, only the champions of the South American leagues participated. In 1966, the runners-up of the South American leagues began to join. In 1998, Mexican teams were invited to compete and contested regularly from 2000 until 2016. In 2000 the tournament was expanded from 20 to 32 teams. Today at least four clubs per country compete in the tournament, with Argentina and Brazil having the most representatives (six and seven clubs, respectively). A group stage has always been used but the number of teams per group has varied.

In the present format, the tournament consists of eight stages, with the first stage taking place in late January. The four surviving teams from the first three stages join 28 teams in the group stage, which consists of eight groups of four teams each. The eight group winners and eight runners-up enter the knockout stages, which end with the final in November. The winner of the Copa Libertadores becomes eligible to play in the FIFA Club World Cup and the Recopa Sudamericana.

Independiente of Argentina is the most successful club in the cup's history, having won the tournament seven times. Argentine clubs have accumulated the most victories with 25 wins, while Brazil has the largest number of winning teams, with 10 clubs having won the title. The cup has been won by 25 clubs, 15 of them more than once, and seven clubs have won two years in a row.

History 

The clashes for the Copa Aldao between the champions of Argentina and Uruguay kindled the idea of continental competition in the 1930s. In 1948, the South American Championship of Champions, the most direct precursor to the Copa Libertadores, was played and organized by the Chilean club Colo-Colo after years of planning and organization. Held in Santiago, it brought together the champions of each nation's top national leagues. The tournament was won by Vasco da Gama of Brazil. The 1948 South American tournament began, in continent-wide reach, the "champions cup" model, resulting in the creation of the European Cup in 1955, as confirmed by Jacques Ferran (one of the "founding fathers" of the European Cup), in a 2015 interview with a Brazilian TV sports programme.

In 1958, the basis and format of the competition were created by Peñarol's board leaders. On October 8, 1958, João Havelange announced, at a UEFA meeting he attended as an invitee, the creation of Copa de Campeones de America (American Champions Cup, renamed in 1965 as Copa Libertadores), as a South American equivalent of the European Cup, so that the champion clubs of both continental confederations could decide "the best club team of the world" in the Intercontinental Cup. On March 5, 1959, at the 24th South American Congress held in Buenos Aires, the competition was ratified by the International Affairs Committee. In 1965, it was named in honor of the heroes of South American liberation, such as Simón Bolívar, José de San Martín, Pedro I, Bernardo O'Higgins, and José Gervasio Artigas, among others.

Format

Qualification 
Most teams qualify for the Copa Libertadores by winning half-year tournaments called the Apertura and Clausura tournaments or by finishing among the top teams in their championship. The countries that use this format are Bolivia, Colombia, Ecuador, Paraguay, Peru, Uruguay and Venezuela. Peru and Ecuador have developed new formats for qualification to the Copa Libertadores involving several stages. Argentina, Brazil and Chile are the only South American leagues to use a European league format instead of the Apertura and Clausura format. However, one berth for the Copa Libertadores can be won by winning the domestic cups in these countries.

Peru, Uruguay and Mexico formerly used a second tournament to decide qualification for the Libertadores (the "Liguilla Pre-Libertadores" between 1992 and 1997, the "Liguilla Pre-Libertadores de América" from 1974 to 2009, and the InterLiga from 2004 to 2010, respectively). Argentina used an analogous method only once in 1992. Since 2011, the winner of the Copa Sudamericana has qualified automatically for the following Copa Libertadores.

For the 2019 edition, the different stages of the competition were contested by the following teams:

The winners of the previous season's Copa Libertadores are given an additional entry if they do not qualify for the tournament through their domestic performance; however, if the title holders qualify for the tournament through their domestic performance, an additional entry is granted to the next eligible team, "replacing" the titleholder.

Rules 

Unlike most other competitions around the world, the Copa Libertadores historically did not use extra time, or away goals. From 1960 to 1987, two-legged ties were decided on points (teams would be awarded 2 points for a win, 1 point for a draw and 0 points for a loss), without considering goal differences. If both teams were level on points after two legs, a third match would be played at a neutral venue. Goal difference would only come into play if the third match was drawn. If the third match did not produce an immediate winner, a penalty shootout was used to determine a winner.

From 1988 onwards, two-legged ties were decided on points, followed by goal difference, with an immediate penalty shootout if the tie was level on aggregate after full-time in the second leg. Starting with the 2005 season, CONMEBOL began to use the away goals rule. In 2008, the finals became an exception to the away goals rule and employed extra time. From 1995 onwards, the "Three points for a win" standard, a system adopted by FIFA in 1995 that places additional value on wins, was adopted in CONMEBOL, with teams now earning 3 points for a win, 1 point for a draw and 0 points for a loss.

Tournament 
The current tournament features 47 clubs competing over a six- to eight-month period. There are three stages: the first, the second and the knockout stage.

The first stage involves 12 clubs in a series of two-legged knockout ties. The six survivors join 26 clubs in the second stage, in which they are divided into eight groups of four. The teams in each group play in a double round-robin format, with each team playing home and away games against every other team in their group. The top two teams from each group are then drawn into the knockout stage, which consists of two-legged knockout ties. From that point, the competition proceeds with two-legged knockout ties to quarterfinals, semifinals, and the finals. Between 1960 and 1987 the previous winners did not enter the competition until the semifinal stage, making it much easier to retain the cup.

Between 1960 and 2004, the winner of the tournament participated in the now-defunct Intercontinental Cup or (after 1980) Toyota Cup, a football competition endorsed by UEFA and CONMEBOL, contested against the winners of the European Cup (since renamed the UEFA Champions League) Since 2004, the winner has played in the Club World Cup, an international competition contested by the champion clubs from all six continental confederations. It is organized by the Fédération Internationale de Football Association (FIFA), the sport's global governing body. Because Europe and South America are considered the strongest centers of the sport, the champions of those continents enter the tournament at the semifinal stage. The winning team also qualifies to play in the Recopa Sudamericana, a two-legged final series against the winners of the Copa Sudamericana.

Prizes

Trophy 

The tournament shares its name with the trophy, also called the Copa Libertadores or simply la Copa, which is awarded to the Copa Libertadores winner. It was designed by goldsmith Alberto de Gasperi, an Italian-born immigrant to Peru, in Camusso Jewelry in Lima at the behest of CONMEBOL. The top of the laurel is made of sterling silver, except for the football player at the top (which is made of bronze with a silver coating).

The pedestal, which contains badges from every winner of the competition, is made of hardwood plywood. The badges show the season, the full name of the winning club, and the city and nation from which the champions hail. To the left of that information is the club logo. Any club which wins three consecutive tournaments has the right to keep the trophy. Today, the current trophy is the third in the history of the competition.

Two clubs have kept the actual trophy after three consecutive wins:

Estudiantes after their third consecutive win in 1970. They won a fourth title in 2009.
Independiente after their third consecutive win, and fifth overall, in 1974. They have since won two more titles, in 1975 and 1984.

Prize money 

, clubs in the Copa Libertadores receive US$500,000 for advancing into the second stage and US$1,000,000 per home match in the group phase, with an additional US$300,000 awarded per match won in that stage. That amount is derived from television rights and stadium advertising. The payment per home match increases to US$1,250,000 in the round of 16. The prize money then increases as each quarterfinalist receives US$1,700,000, US$2,300,000 is given to each semifinalist, US$7,000,000 is awarded to the runner-up, and the winner earns US$18,000,000.

Eliminated at the first stage: US$400,000
Eliminated at the second stage: US$500,000
Eliminated at the third stage: US$600,000
Group stage: US$3,000,000
Group stage win: US$300,000
Round of 16: US$1,250,000
Quarter-finals: US$1,700,000
Semi-finals: US$2,300,000
Runners-up: US$7,000,000
Champions: US$18,000,000

Cultural impact

The Copa Libertadores occupies an important space in South American culture. The folklore, fanfare, and organization of many competitions around the world owe its aspects to the Libertadores.

The "Sueño Libertador"

The  ("Liberator Dream") is a promotional phrase used by sports journalism in the context of winning or attempting to win the Copa Libertadores. Thus, when a team gets eliminated from the competition, it is said that the team has awakened from the liberator dream. The project normally starts after the club wins its national league (which grants them the right to compete in the following year's Copa Libertadores).

It is common for clubs to spend large sums of money to win the Copa Libertadores. In 1998 for example, Vasco da Gama spent $10 million to win the competition, and in 1998, Palmeiras, managed by Luiz Felipe Scolari, brought Júnior Baiano among other players, winning the 1999 Copa Libertadores. The tournament is highly regarded among its participants. In 2010, players from Guadalajara stated that they would rather play in the Copa Libertadores final than appear in a friendly against Spain, then reigning world champions, and dispute their national league. Similarly, after their triumph in the 2010 Copa do Brasil, several Santos players made it known that they wished to stay at the club and participate in the 2011 Copa Libertadores, despite having multimillion-dollar contracts lined up for them at clubs participating in the UEFA Champions League, such as Chelsea of England and Lyon of France.

Former Boca Juniors goalkeeper Óscar Córdoba has stated that the Copa Libertadores was the most prestigious trophy he won in his career (above the Argentine league, Intercontinental Cup, etc.)

'La Copa se mira y no se toca'
Since its inception in 1960, the Copa Libertadores had predominantly been won by clubs from nations with an Atlantic coast: Argentina, Brazil and Uruguay. Olimpia of Paraguay became the first team outside of those nations to win the Copa Libertadores when they triumphed in 1979.

The first club from a country with a Pacific coast to reach a final was Universitario of Lima, Peru, who lost in 1972 against Independiente of Argentina. The following year, Independiente defeated Colo-Colo of Chile, another Pacific team, creating the myth that the trophy would never go to the west, giving birth to the saying, "La Copa se mira y no se toca". Unión Española became the third Pacific team to reach the final in 1975, although they also lost to Independiente. Atletico Nacional of Medellín, Colombia, won the Copa Libertadores in 1989, becoming the first nation with a Pacific coastline to win the tournament. In 1990 and 1998 Barcelona Sporting Club, of Ecuador also made it to the final but lost both finals to Olimpia and CR Vasco da Gama respectively.

Other clubs from nations with Pacific coastlines to have won the competition are Colo-Colo of Chile in 1991, Once Caldas of Colombia in 2004, and LDU Quito of Ecuador in 2008. Atletico Nacional of Colombia earned their second title in 2016. Particular mockery was used from Argentinian teams to Chilean teams for never having obtained the Copa Libertadores, so after Colo-Colo's triumph in 1991 a new phrase saying "la copa se mira y se toca" was implemented in Chile.

Ambassador 

Pelé, regarded by many football historians, former players and fans to be the best footballer in the game's history, was appointed ambassador of the Copa Libertadores in 2008 by Banco Santander, the competition's main sponsor by then. The assignment was then renovated as the corporation considered Pelé "a promoter of the competition with his team Santos FC during the 1960s".

In 1999, he was voted as the Football Player of the Century by the IFFHS International Federation of Football History and Statistics. In the same year, French weekly magazine France-Football consulted their former "Ballon D'Or" winners to elect the Football Player of the Century. Pelé came in first place. In 1999 the International Olympic Committee named Pelé the "Athlete of the Century".

Media coverage

The tournament attracts television audiences beyond South America, Mexico, and Spain. Matches are broadcast in over 135 countries, with commentary in more than 30 languages, and thus the Copa is often considered one of the most watched sports events on TV; Fox Sports, for example, reaches more than 25 million households in the Americas. Movistar+ broadcasts live Copa Libertadores matches in Spain.

As of January 19, 2019 beIN Sports has obtained the broadcasting rights for Australia, Canada, MENA, New Zealand, and the United States beginning in 2019 through 2022.

Sponsorship
From 1997 to 2017, the competition had a single main sponsor for naming rights. The first major sponsor was Toyota, who signed a ten-year contract with CONMEBOL in 1997. The second major sponsor was Banco Santander, who signed a five-year contract with CONMEBOL in 2008. The third major sponsor was Bridgestone, who signed a sponsorship deal for naming rights for a period of five years from 2013 edition to 2017.

As of 2023, sponsors of Copa Libertadores are:

 Amstel
 Coca-Cola
 Crypto.com
 Entain plc
 EA Sports
 Mastercard
 TCL

Match ball
Nike supplies the official match ball since 2003, as they do for all other CONMEBOL competitions. As of 2022, the current match ball for the Copa Libertadores is the Nike Flight.

The Flight model was introduced in 2020 in replacement of the "Merlin" by the same manufacturer. A different version of the Flight had been used during the 2021 Copa América.

Records and statistics 

The data below does not include the 1948 South American Championship of Champions, as it is not listed by Conmebol either as a Copa Libertadores edition or as an official competition. However, at least in the years 1996/1997, Conmebol entitled equal status to both Copa Libertadores and the 1948 tournament, in that the 1948 champion club (CR Vasco da Gama) was allowed to participate in Supercopa Libertadores, a Conmebol official competition that allowed participation for former Libertadores champions only (for example, not admitting participation for champions of other Conmebol official competitions, such as Copa CONMEBOL).

List of finals

Performances by club 
Bolivia and Venezuela are the only countries never to reach a final. Beyond them, Peru (and Mexico in their invitational period) are the only ones never to win a final.

Performances by nation

Most goals

Most appearances

See also
 Copa Libertadores Femenina
 Copa Sudamericana
 Continental football championships
 South American Championship of Champions
 Copa Aldao

References

Further reading

External links 

 

 Copa Libertadores on the RSSSF
 Conmebol Libertadores news at Fox Sports Mexico 
 Copa Libertadores news at ESPN 
 Copa Libertadores at Univision 
 Copa Libertadores at worldfootball.net 
 Copa Libertadores at southamericanfutbol.com (archived)

 
CONMEBOL club competitions
Recurring sporting events established in 1960
Multi-national professional sports leagues